Bukit Bintang Boys Secondary School (abbreviated SMKLBB or BBBSS) was established in 1958, making it one of the oldest secondary boys school in the city of Petaling Jaya

The school only holds one school session. The morning session is for Form 1 to Form 5 students. This is so to accommodate the large number of students attending the school. The pupils are known as "BBians". It welcomes students from all races and religions.

History
The school was founded by Miss Mary Glasgow, who was the headmistress of Bukit Bintang Girls' School (BBGS)

The municipal council, Majlis Perbandaran Petaling Jaya (MPPJ) (now named Majlis Bandaraya Petaling Jaya, MBPJ); allocated a piece of land to Glasgow for building a school for the community. Although the land was available, no money was provided to build it. Glasgow and the Bukit Bintang Girls' School students swung into action; raising money by holding fun fairs, food fairs and plays. Within a short time, the girls had raised enough to build the boys' school. Miss Yeoh Kim Eng (a retired teacher of BBGS) recounted the time when BBGS teachers and students, armed with buckets and bins, came to the newly built boys' school to wash and clean the building.

At its establishment, The Malay Mail, a local daily, called it the brother school of Bukit Bintang Girls' School. After deliberation with teachers and advisers to name the new school, Glasgow named it Bukit Bintang Boys' Secondary School in connection to the girls' school Glasgow founded.

As a young nation in 1957-58, the Malaysian government welcomed help from all quarters to build schools and to give its citizens an education. Christian missionaries such as Glasgow opened "Christian" schools in the early 1960s, usually in the rural areas. They either bought land or were granted land in outskirt areas (often rural, undeveloped areas) and were left to their own ingenuity to develop and build their schools. Although the schools were started by missionaries, the curriculum was based on government guidelines and was usually non-religious, although Bible studies were encouraged. Initially, classes were taught in English but has since changed to Bahasa Melayu in line with the government directives. Since 2003, Science and Mathematics are taught in English.

The school's first Principal (known as the Headmaster) was Mr. Alastair L. McGregor (now Doctor) from Scotland. He served the school from 1958 to 1966. He was only a young man of 28 when he accepted the challenge to run a school halfway round the world from his home in Scotland, United Kingdom.

In 1961, the secondary school was moved to its current location in Jalan Utara, Petaling Jaya; and at that time, each form (Form 1 to 5) consisted of only one class. A year later in 1962 - the year when the first group of students sat for the Cambridge Examination, the school's opening ceremony took place and McGregor was appointed the first headmaster.

In 1976, a new science block was built at the cost of RM200,000.00. This block consists of three science laboratories and a lecture theatre. This block was named 'The Boler Block' in honour of Mr. David Boler, the headmaster at the time. Funds to build new wings were mostly raised by the students and teachers. Help was also given by certain Christian associations.

In 2000, Bukit Bintang Girls' School moved to a new location in Cheras and did not retain its original name; it is now known as SMK Seri Bintang Utara. The Pavilion shopping centre was built over the old location.

50th Anniversary

In 2008, the school celebrated its 50th anniversary (Golden Jubilee). Tan Sri Musa Hassan, Malaysia's Inspector-General of Police, a BB alumnus, was the guest of honour. A 50th anniversary T-shirt was released and sold by the school Co-operative.

School identity
The school motto is the Latin phrase: Nisi Dominus Frustra – 'Without God All is Vanity'; and is derived from Psalm 127:1.

Headteachers

 Sir Alastair L. McGregor (1958–1965)
 Mr. David Boler (1966–1978)
 Mr. Oh Kong Lum (1979–1995)
 Mdm. Ishah bt. Sulaiman (1996–2005)
 Mdm. Quah Mooi Eng (2006–2011)
 Mdm. Tong Ah Ten (2011-2013)
 Mdm. Koh Sui Keng (2013–2017)
 Mr. Parthipan A/L Subramaniam (2017-2022)
 Dr. Ts. Hj. Shanusi bin Hj Ahmad (2022-present)

The school badge
The second headmaster, Mr. David Boler (1966–1978) designed a new school badge when he replaced Mr. McGregor. The top left hand corner of the badge depicts hills which stands for 'Bukit' followed by the top right hand corner which shows a star which stands for 'Bintang', a Malay word meaning star. The bottom left hand corner indicates the national flower 'Bunga Raya' (Hibiscus) and thus represents 'Malaysia.'

The design of a roof above the letters 'PJ' means that the school is situated in Petaling Jaya. The shape that resembles a gear below the letters 'PJ' symbolises that Petaling Jaya is an industrialised area. Mr. Boler redesigned the school tie by adding the design of the school badge onto the plain olive green tie.

School magazine
The school magazine is "The Bintang". The magazine reports the school's activities for the year, club activities, official school functions, news about teachers and students.

Old Boys' Association
Some of the former students who had left BBBSS, referred to as “Ex-BBians”; have banded together in the group called the Old Boys' Association, or the OBA. They have registered the group in 2012 under the name of BBBSS Alumni Association.

Facilities

In 2007, the school Co-operative was formed, named "Koperasi Sekolah Menengah Kebangsaan Laki-laki Bukit Bintang Berhad". The original business centre was set up at the previous counselling room. In 2008, it was moved to the room behind the Canteen Area (earlier the Music Room). The shareholders of the Co-operative are students and teachers. The products sold are mostly stationery and books, but now have included buns and ice-cream. After the Government announced that free textbooks would be given to all students, the Co-operative took over the role of school bookshop.

In 2008, the road from the main gate to the squash complex was tarred. A new Computer Laboratory was made in the same year, with 30 computers that were donated by the public. The Computer Lab had earlier occupied the Auditorium, now occupy the room which was formerly the Snooker Room. A new Teacher's Cafe, a lounge for Teachers, was unveiled on Graduation Day in August 2009, in the presence of Madam Sharon Kang, the main sponsor. A new wall was built around the Squash Complex. Towards the end of the school year, with contributions from an ex-BBian, a gymnasium was installed in one of the Squash Complex classes.

In 2010, the old wiring system of the school was rewired and seven air-conditioners were installed in the Dewan McGregor. The stairs from the front of the Badminton Hall to the Canteen were upgraded, as were the stairs from the Canteen to the field.

In 2011, the auditorium was renovated, replacing the carpet flooring with newer flooring.

In 2013, the Dewan McGregor was renovated to fix its collapsing ceiling and to renovate the floor with new tiles. The girls' toilet was renovated, reducing the number of cubicles to make space for a new room. The area outside the Badminton Hall was renovated to fix the cracking pavements, and also to install new shades for the covered walkway. The school canteen was renovated to new floor and pillar tiles, and wooden seats were added to previously bare metal benches. The Squash Complex also was renovated in this year. The field and Kemahiran Hidup (KH) Labs are undergoing upgrading works.

Largest squash court complex in Petaling Jaya
In 1985, a project to construct a new canteen and a gymnasium cum squash courts was completed at a cost nearly half a million Ringgit. Students, teachers and parents raised funds over five years from 1981 to 1985. Fund-raising projects such as "Jog-a-thon", Canteen Day and School Fun Fair were conducted during the period. Upon its completion, it produced the largest squash court facilities in Petaling Jaya.

The old canteen was used as a temporary classroom to accommodate the increasing number of students but was eventually demolished. The new double storey block housed a hall upstairs and canteen downstairs. The new school hall also doubled as badminton courts. The batch of students sitting for their 1985 SPM examinations took their examinations in the new hall. Members of the public can rent the squash courts and the badminton hall for their private usage. The squash complex has played host to international tournaments, prominently the Milo All Stars Junior Squash Championship, in which it partners with the MBPJ Squash Complex.

Events

Yearly events
Every year there is an Annual General Meeting for the Parents-Teachers Association, called Mesyuarat Agung PIBG.

The Cross Country Run (Merentas Desa) is held early in the year.

The annual Sport Day is held at Stadium Kelana Jaya. Athletes compete in track races. Beforehand, there will be Sukantara and Saringan held for the Sport Houses to compete for points, in the school compounds and Astaka Field.

Academic Excellence Day (Hari Kecemerlangan) is held annually to praise students with notable achievements in academics. The "Piala Pusingan McGregor" given to one outstanding student.

Co-curricular Day (Hari Ko-Kurikulum) is held annually to praise students and athletes of the school who have made notable achievements and contributions to co-curricular activities.

The report card day is held at badminton hall twice a year. This day parents are invited by the school to hear from what teachers had to say about their children performance in their academic.

Other notable events
Hari Raya Open House, held in the school compound (at the front of the Boler Block in 2009, in the Dewan McGregor in 2010), celebrates the Hari Raya celebrations with all BBians invited.

Chinese New Year Open House was held in the Dewan McGregor since 2008, celebrating Chinese New Year, with Yee Sang every year. A line of BBians would form in front of Madam Quah, as she would be giving out Red Packets to students during the event.

Hari Keluarga, held in 2008, has a variety of guests, ranging from BBians to parents and other families. The school compound is turned into a bazaar selling items ranging from food and toys, to school caps and Polo T-shirts.

Jogathon 2010 was held on 17 July, with the mission of collecting funds to upgrade the school facilities. Students were given cards to record donations. Donations were not only in the form of money, but also as items such as coupons, hampers and branded goods. The fund collection was about RM57,000.

On 22 July 2011, Mdm. Quah Mooi Eng's retirement ceremony was held. Students and peers, including principals and education officers in Petaling district; attended the event to bid farewell to her.

Graduation Day (Hari Graduasi) was held for the first time in 2010, and then on 10 November 2011. In this event, the senior students, Form 5 and Upper 6; are celebrated for their years in the school, and students and teachers bid their farewells and express their thanks.

Notable alumni

Some notable ex- BBians include 

 Tengku Zafrul Aziz, Malaysia ex-Minister of Finance (2021-2022) and Minister of International Trade and Industry since 2022
 Musa Hassan, Inspector-General of the Royal Malaysian Police (2006 to 2010)
 Dr Yee Chee Seng, Consultant Rheumatologist at Doncaster and Bassetlaw NHS Trust, Doncaster, United Kingdom
 Dr Richard Chua Kok Wah, Consultant Neurologist, Sunway Medical Centre and at the ANOC Neuroscience and Orthopaedic Centre, Malaysia
 Dr Jason Leong, Malaysian comedian and former medical doctor
 Chee Seng Ho, Head, Rewards and Performance Management, CIMB
 Chye Pang Hsiang, Principal, Consulting Actuary, Milliman, Hong Kong  
 Lucien Young (formerly Lucien Yong), Commercial lawyer and Corporate legal counsel, Adelaide, Australia
 Reshmonu, recording artist
Wari@Storm Mazlan, Musician, Director, Writer, Producer. Graduated class of 1995
 Irfan Khairi, Malaysian internet millionaire.
 Dhruva Murugasu, achieved 5As in Cambridge International A Level, and Top in the World (June 2009) in Further Mathematics.
 Avinaash Subramaniam  was admitted into Harvard University; being the only Malaysian entering the class of 2014.
 Emmett Roslan, founding member of Butterfingers was graduated from class of 1994.
 Azlan Rudy Malik, founding member of Pop Shuvit was graduated from class of 1994.

Information
The school's annual Sports Day used to be held at "Padang Timur" (The East (Malay word: Timur) Field (Malay word: Padang)) as the school field is unable to accommodate the number of students and sporting events. Now it is held at the MBPJ Stadium, Kelana Jaya. In 2012, Sports Day was held within the school compound itself instead.

See also 
 List of schools in Selangor

References

External links

 Official BBBSS Old Boys Association - Alumni association
 School song - BB school song

Secondary schools in Selangor
Educational institutions established in 1958
1958 establishments in Malaya
Publicly funded schools in Malaysia
Boys' schools in Malaysia
Christian schools in Malaysia
Schools in Selangor